Get Dead or Die Trying is the debut studio album by British death metal band The Rotted (formerly known as Gorerotted). 28 Days Later is a cover of the soundtrack song In the House - In a Heartbeat from the film of the same name, composed by John Murphy.

Track listing
 "Nothin' but a Nosebleed" – 2:54
 "The Howling" – 2:54
 "A Return to Insolence" – 3:41
 "Kissing You with My Fists" – 2:56
 "Angel of Meth" – 3:17
 "A Brief Moment of Regret" – 2:38
 "The Body Tree" – 3:42
 "Get Dead or Die Trying" – 2:37
 "It's Like There's a Party in My Mouth (and Everyone's Being Sick)" – 3:05
 "Fear and Loathing in Old London Town" – 3:56
 "28 Days Later" – 6:41

Personnel
 Ben McCrow - Vocals
 Tim Carley - Guitar
 Gian Pyres - Guitar
 Phil Wilson - Bass
 Nate Gould - Drums

2008 debut albums
The Rotted albums
Metal Blade Records albums